Jameson is an ghost town in Douglas County, in the U.S. state of Washington.

A post office called Jameson was established in 1906, and remained in operation until 1912. The community bore the name of an early settler.

References

Ghost towns in Washington (state)
Geography of Douglas County, Washington